Marystown Central High School is a public high school located in Marystown, Newfoundland and Labrador.

Funded by the federal government, Marystown Central High School was opened in 1972. Funded by a Department of Regional Economic Expansion (DREE) grant, it was considered to be a state of the art school and continues to be so today.

History
Upon its opening, approximately six-hundred and fifty students attended the school. This included grades seven through eleven.  The principal at the time was Leo Whalen, and the vice principal was Frank Kennedy.

Administration
The principal is David Babb, and the assistant principal is Susan Tobin-Bursey.

Motto
Quaerite Veritatem is the school's motto.  It is Latin for "Search for Truth."  This slogan appears on the school's crest.

Science and technology labs
The school has two science laboratories at its disposal: the biology lab and the chemistry lab. It also has two computer facilities, serving a number of functions including: design, graphic editing, web-design and web-page creation.

References

External links
School website
Newfoundland and Labrador English School District website

High schools in Newfoundland and Labrador
1972 establishments in Canada
Educational institutions established in 1972